Dresden Generating Station (also known as Dresden Nuclear Power Plant or Dresden Nuclear Power Station) is the first privately financed nuclear power plant built in the United States. Dresden 1 was activated in 1960 and retired in 1978. Operating since 1970 are Dresden units 2 and 3, two General Electric BWR-3 boiling water reactors.  Dresden Station is located on a  site in Grundy County, Illinois, at the head of the Illinois River, near the city of Morris. It is immediately northeast of the Morris Operation—the only de facto high-level radioactive waste storage site in the United States. It serves Chicago and the northern quarter of the state of Illinois, capable of producing 867 megawatts of electricity from each of its two reactors, enough to power over one million average American homes.

In 2004, the Nuclear Regulatory Commission (NRC) renewed the operating licenses for both reactors, extending them from forty years to sixty.

Unit 1

After the Atomic Energy Act of 1954 allowed private companies to own and operate nuclear facilities, Commonwealth Edison contracted with General Electric to design, construct, and place into operation the 192 MWe Dresden Unit 1 for $45M in 1955. One-third of the contract price was shared by a consortium of eight companies comprising the Nuclear Power Group Inc.

The BWR at GE's Vallecitos Nuclear Center and the AEC's BORAX experiments provided research data and operator training for Dresden.

The core contained 488 fuel subassemblies, 80 control rods, and 8 instrument nozzles. Each subassembly contained 36 fuel rods in a Zircaloy-2 channel. The fuel was uranium dioxide clad in Zircaloy-2 tube. The core thermal power was 626 MWt. The reactor vessel was rated to 1015 psia and measured 12 ft. 2 in. diameter and 42 ft. tall.

The reactor featured a dual cycle, with steam coming from both the stream drum and steam generators. This made for rapid response to changes in power demand. Reactor power was regulated by actuation of the secondary admission valve by the turbine's governor. Decreasing the rate of secondary steam reduces reactor power, and vice versa. Thus, the secondary pressure varies with the external load.

Cooling 
The plant has three cooling modes:

Direct open-cycle mode: Intake from canal leading to the Kankakee River, discharge directly to the Illinois River. The cooling canal system, cooling lake, and the supplementary cooling towers are completely bypassed in this mode of operation.
Indirect open-cycle mode: Intake from canal leading to the Kankakee River, discharge to cooling canal leading to Dresden Cooling Lake, discharged from lake through return cooling canal that eventually discharges into the Illinois River. Use of the cooling towers for supplemental cooling of canal system water is usually necessary during this mode of operation.
Closed-cycle mode: Intake from return cooling canal leading back from Dresden Cooling Lake, discharge to cooling canal leading to Dresden Cooling Lake. Use of the cooling towers for supplemental cooling of canal system water is usually not necessary during this mode of operation.

It also has cooling towers

Electricity Production

Incidents
Between the 1970s and 1996, Dresden was fined $1.6 million for 25 incidents.
 June 5, 1970: A false high pressure signal due to instrument failure on the Dresden II reactor pressure control system caused turbine valves to dump steam (a "turbine trip"), which in turn automatically initiated a SCRAM. Void collapse in the reactor water caused the reactor water level to drop, which resulted in an automatic increase in feedwater flow. The feedwater pumps then tripped on low suction pressure. One pump turned back on automatically when the low suction pressure signal reset, feeding water rapidly into the now lower-pressure reactor vessel. Water level in the reactor rose rapidly until water entered the main steam lines. At this point, the false high pressure signal disappeared. The turbine dump valves closed, increasing back pressure in the reactor vessel and slowing the feedwater inlet flow. Cooling reactor water temperature caused further void collapse. Reactor water level began to rapidly lower once again. This again automatically caused the feedwater system to increase the flow rate into the vessel, and began to raise reactor water level. As cooler feedwater was again rapidly pumped into the reactor, void collapse caused water level to lower. The feedwater system responded by increasing feedwater flow. However, the indicator needle on the water level recorder stuck, which caused the operator to assume level had stopped rising in the reactor. The operator began increasing feedwater flow in order to raise water level in the reactor, manually overriding the automatic control system. The operator never checked a second indicator that showed the increasing level. Reactor water level continued rising and flooded the main steam lines. Two minutes later, the operator tapped on the water level recorder and the water level needle became unstuck, at which point the operator began reacting to the now high water level by manually reducing feedwater flow. At this point, the operator manually opened a steam line relief valve to reduce rising reactor pressure. However, due to the earlier introduction of water into the main steam lines, a hydrostatic shock occurred in the steam lines, which caused a safety valve to open, admitting steam and water into the drywell causing drywell pressure to increase. This caused the initiation of safety injection systems, and for the next 30 minutes reactor water level and pressure seesawed as the operators attempted to stabilize the reactor. It was not until two hours later that reactor level, reactor pressure and drywell pressure were reduced to normal. The movie The China Syndrome bases its initial plot device on this event, with the needle becoming unstuck when the operator taps the recorder.
 December 8, 1971: Events similar to the ones the year earlier on Dresden II occur on Dresden III.
 May 15, 1996: Lowering water levels around the nuclear fuel in unit 3 reactor's core prompt a shut down at Dresden Generating Station and placement on the NRC's "watch list" that merit closer scrutiny by regulators. Dresden was on the NRC watch list six out of nine years between 1987-1996, longer than any of the 70 other operating plants in the nation.
 July 15, 2011: Plant declared an Alert at 10:16 a.m after a chemical leak of sodium hypochlorite restricted access to a vital area that houses plant cooling water pumps.

Surrounding population

The 2010 U.S. population within  of Dresden was 83,049, an increase of 47.6 percent in a decade, according to an analysis of U.S. Census data for msnbc.com. The 2010 U.S. population within  was 7,305,482, an increase of 3.5 percent since 2000. Cities within 50 miles include Chicago (43 miles to city center).

Ownership
Both currently operating units are owned and operated by Constellation Energy following separation from Exelon, which also owns and is responsible for the decommissioning of Unit 1. Prior to August 3, 2000, all three units were owned by Commonwealth Edison.

Seismic risk
The Nuclear Regulatory Commission's estimate of the risk each year of an earthquake intense enough to cause core damage to the reactor at Dresden was 1 in 52,632, according to an NRC study published in August 2010.

Averted closure
In August 2020, Exelon announced they would close the plant in November 2021 for economic reasons, despite the plant having licenses to operate for about another 10 years and the ability to renew the licenses for an additional 20 years beyond that. On September 13, 2021, the Illinois state senate passed a bill subsidizing the Byron and Dresden nuclear plants, which Governor JB Pritzker signed into law on September 15, and Exelon announced it would refuel the plants.

Notes

References

External links

http://www.eia.gov/cneaf/nuclear/state_profiles/illinois/il.html#_ftn4
https://www.nrc.gov/info-finder/decommissioning/power-reactor/dresden-nuclear-power-station-unit-1.html

Energy infrastructure completed in 1960
Energy infrastructure completed in 1970
Energy infrastructure completed in 1971
Nuclear power plants in Illinois
Buildings and structures in Grundy County, Illinois
Illinois River
Exelon